Derek Linnell (born November 15, 1968) is a Canadian former professional ice hockey defenceman.

Linnell attended University of Alaska Fairbanks where he played NCAA Division I hockey with the Alaska Nanooks. In February 1992 he was forced to leave the team after it was found he was in violation of NCAA rules by playing while in his sixth year of college.

Linnell began his professional career with the 1992–93 season, playing three seasons with the ECHL team, before jumping to the West Coast Hockey League to play the 1995–96 season with the Alaska Gold Kings.

References

External links

1968 births
Living people
Alaska Nanooks men's ice hockey players
Albany River Rats players
Canadian ice hockey defencemen
Minnesota Moose players
Raleigh IceCaps players
Ice hockey people from Calgary